Samuel Barron (September 25, 1765 – October 29, 1810) was a United States Navy officer. He was an older brother of Commodore James Barron, also a US Navy officer.

Early life

Samuel Barron was born in Hampton, Virginia, the son of a merchant captain named James Barron who became Commodore of the tiny Virginia State Navy during the American Revolution. Barron studied at William and Mary College, and received his early training at sea from his father. He became a midshipman on the frigate Dragon and served in the Virginia Navy during the latter part of the Revolutionary War. After a number of years as a merchant captain, he joined the fledgling United States Navy.

Military career

For the squadron officers, Barron's health was a subject of continuous concern and frustration…and in early November 1804, he moved ashore - yet he refused to give up command and never stopped hoping that he would recover.”  In 1805 he turned over command of his squadron to John Rodgers and returned to the United States due to poor health. He was then assigned command of the Gosport Shipyard in Virginia. His health never fully recovered and on 29 October 1810 Lt. Robert Henley his executive officer reported  to the Secretary of the Navy "I have the painful duty to inform you of the death of Commodore Samuel Barron. In apparent good health, he was attacked while at dinner yesterday in Hampton with an apoplectic fit and expired about 10 o'clock this morning." Commodore Barron was buried at Hampton Virginia age 45.

Samuel Barron's son, Samuel Barron (1809–1888), served with distinction in the United States Navy, until he resigned his commission in April 1861 to join the Confederate States Navy during the American Civil War.

References

1765 births
1810 deaths
People from Hampton, Virginia
United States Navy officers
United States Navy commodores